Angel Links is an anime series produced by Sunrise and directed by Yūji Yamaguchi. It is a spin-off of the anime adaptation of Takehiko Ito's Outlaw Star, which was also produced by Sunrise. Angel Links follows the principal character Li Meifon, the head of a pro bono organization dedicated to protecting outer space transportation vessels from pirates.

The 13 episodes that are comprised by Angel Links originally aired on Japan's Wowow television network from April 7 to June 30, 1999. Bandai Visual released the series on DVD in Japan in seven separate volumes from August 25, 1999 to March 25, 2000. A DVD box set containing the entire series was published on July 28, 2006. Yet another box set titled "Emotion the Best: Seihō Tenshi Angel Links" was released in Japan on September 24, 2010. The anime was later licensed for English language distribution in North America by Bandai Entertainment. It was initially released in this region on DVD in four separate volumes and was later compiled into a "Complete Collection" box set on July 1, 2003. Finally, the series was re-released in a box set as part of Bandai's "Anime Legends" label on April 25, 2006.

The musical score of Angel Links was composed by Toshihiko Sahashi. The series features one opening theme, "All My Soul" by Naw Naw, and one closing theme, "True Moon" by Riwako Miyawara.

Episodes

References

Outlaw Star
Angel Links